Sar Takhtgah (also Romanized as Sar Takhtgāh and Sartakhtgāh) is a village in Gurani Rural District, Gahvareh District, Dalahu County, Kermanshah Province, Iran. At the 2006 census, its population was 195, in 52 families.

References 

Populated places in Dalahu County